Friedrich Ludwig von Keller (17 October 1799, in Zürich – 11 September 1860, in Berlin) was a Swiss-German jurist.

Biography
He was educated at Berlin and Göttingen, where he was a pupil of Savigny. In 1825, he returned to Zürich where he was appointed professor of civil law in the university. He was a leader of the Liberal Radical party and in 1831 became head of the Swiss justiciary. In 1843-47 he was professor in the University of Halle. He then moved to Berlin, where he became professor at the university. He became a conservative member of the Prussian House of Representatives, and because of his services to the monarchical party was ennobled.

Works
 Ueber Litiskontestation und Urteil (Zürich 1827)
 Der römische Civilprocess und die Aktionen in summarischer Darstellung zum Gebrauche bei Vorlesungen (Leipzig 1852; 6th ed., 1883)
His Vorlesungen über die Pandekten was edited by Emil Albert Friedberg (1861), and by William Lewis (1867).

Notes

References

 
 Gabor Hamza, "Anmerkungen zu römischrechtlichen Einflüssen in der Geschichte der schweizerischen Privatrechtswissenschaft und Privatrechtskodifikation", Orbis Iuris Romani 8 (2003) pp. 9-20.
 Gabor Hamza, "Entstehung und Entwicklung der modernen Privatrechtsordnungen und die römischrechtliche Tradition", Budapest 2009, pp. 240-244.

1799 births
1860 deaths
Swiss jurists
Jurists from Berlin
Academic staff of the University of Halle
Academic staff of the University of Zurich
Academic staff of the Humboldt University of Berlin
Members of the Prussian House of Representatives
Swiss emigrants to Germany